The Michigan Wolverines men's soccer team is the intercollegiate soccer program representing the University of Michigan. The school competes in the Big Ten Conference in Division I of the National Collegiate Athletic Association (NCAA).

History

Soccer became a varsity sport at the University of Michigan in 2000. The team plays at the U-M Soccer Stadium that was built in 2010.

Colors and badge 
The team colors of Michigan are maize and blue. The badge is formed in a shape of a shield. At the top it has the word Michigan inscribed in maize behind a blue background, with the word Soccer on the bottom and a block M in the middle.

Roster

Coaching staff

Source

Year-by-year record

Source

Professional players 
 Tyler Arnone – (Real Monarchs)
 Francis Atuahene – (Detroit City FC)
 Marcello Borges – (New York Red Bulls II)
 Knox Cameron – (Columbus Crew)
 Luke Coulson – (Cardiff City FC, Barnet F.C.)
 Lars Eckenrode – (Toronto FC II)
 Adam Grinwis – (Rochester Rhinos, Saint Louis FC)
 Michael Holody – (Colorado Rapids)
 Evan Louro – (New York Red Bulls II)
 Peri Marosevic – (FC Dallas, Austin Aztex FC, Toronto FC, New York Cosmos)
 Justin Meram – (Columbus Crew SC, Orlando City SC, Atlanta United FC, Real Salt Lake)
 Robbie Mertz – (Colorado Rapids)
 Kofi Opare – (LA Galaxy, D.C. United)
 Jackson Ragen – (Seattle Sounders FC 2)
 Matt Rickard – (Plymouth Argyle)
 Soony Saad – (Sporting Kansas City, BEC Tero Sasana, Pattaya United, Swope Park Rangers, Indy Eleven, Al Ansar, Ansan Greeners)
 Kevin Taylor – (Rochester Rhinos, Minnesota Thunder)
 Marcos Ugarte – (Rochester Rhinos)

Stadium

Michigan has played at the U-M Soccer Complex since 2008, and at the U-M Soccer Stadium (built on the site of the Soccer Complex) since 2010. The entire complex cost $6 million to build and includes three fields, including separate practice fields for both the men's and women's teams. The 2,200-seat stadium is built around the central field, and it includes stands on both sides of the field that are both covered by a roof. The stadium features a press box, separate home locker rooms for both the men's and women's teams, an athletic medicine training room, and handicap seating, as well as restrooms and concessions for spectators.

Michigan Ultras
The Michigan Ultras is the student support section for both the men's and the women's team. They support the Michigan Wolverines men's and women's soccer teams from the student section. The section consists of over 900 members, is located in the student bleachers of the U-M Soccer Complex, and is a registered official student organization with the University of Michigan. The Michigan Ultras was officially founded in the spring of 2010 by Matthew Peven. Possessing an ever-growing fanbase, their members are known for their loyal dedication in supporting the men's and women's soccer teams by creating an exciting and intimidating atmosphere through organized chanting and cheering. Several of their chants can be found on their YouTube page and website.

See also 
Michigan–Michigan State men's soccer rivalry
Michigan Wolverines women's soccer

References

External links 

 

 
2000 establishments in Michigan